Reuben Post (January 17, 1792 – September 24, 1858) was a Presbyterian clergyman who served two separate terms as Chaplain of the United States House of Representatives (1824 and 1831) and also served as Chaplain of the Senate of the United States (1819).

Early life 

Post was born January 17, 1792, in Cornwall, Vermont, the son of Roswell and Martha (Mead) Post.  He graduated from Middlebury College, Vermont, in 1814, then studied for the ministry at Princeton Theological Seminary.

Ministry 

Post was ordained in Washington, D.C. on June 24, 1819.  He was immediately installed as the second pastor of First Presbyterian Church, Washington D.C., succeeding Rev. John Brackenridge, D.D.   John Quincy Adams was a regular worshiper there during Post's tenure.

On December 9, 1819, Post was named Chaplain of the Senate.  On December 6, 1824, and again on December 5, 1831, Rev. Reuben Post was named Chaplain of the United States House of Representatives.

Post continued at First Presbyterian Church until June 24, 1836, when he was called to serve the Circular Church in Charleston, South Carolina.  His inaugural sermon at the Circular Church was from Acts 10:29.

Personal life 

Reuben Post married Harriet Moffitt, a granddaughter of Richard Henry Lee, on January 7, 1823.  Their children were: William, Harriet Lee (Mrs. Henry L. Pinckney), Emily, Frances, and Richard Henry Lee Post.

Later years 

Post served as pastor of the Circular Church for 23 years.  He was also president of the board of supervisors of the high school in Charleston.  In 1858, Post took a vacation to his native Vermont; while there a yellow fever epidemic broke out in Charleston.  Post returned at once to care for members of his congregation, and soon fell victim himself and died in the 23rd year of his pastorate there.  A memorial tablet was placed in the church and his gravestone is in the church courtyard, along with those of his wife and daughter—they are in the shapes of chess pieces: a king, a queen and a rook.

References 

1792 births
1858 deaths
People from Cornwall, Vermont
American Presbyterian ministers
Chaplains of the United States House of Representatives
Chaplains of the United States Senate
Middlebury College alumni
Princeton Theological Seminary alumni
19th-century American clergy